Abhimanyu Khod (born 10 October 1991) is an Indian cricketer from Haryana. He is a left-handed batsman and bowls right-arm medium.

First-class Career

He has represented Haryana in First-class, List-A cricket and T20 cricket. He made his First-class debut in November 2011 and almost a year and a half later he represented his state in List-A and T20 cricket as well.

His last appearance in FC/List-A/T20 was in February 2015.

See also
Haryana cricket team

References

External links 
 
 CricPlayer's profile

1991 births
Indian cricketers
Living people